St. Mary of Czestochowa Church may refer to:

St. Mary of Czestochowa Church (Middletown, Connecticut)
St. Mary of Częstochowa in Cicero, Cicero, Illinois